Micklethwaite is a surname. Notable people with the surname include:

F. W. Micklethwaite, (1849–1925), Canadian photographer
Sir John Micklethwaite, (1612–1682), English physician
John Thomas Micklethwaite, (1843–1906), English architect
Joseph Micklethwaite, 1st Viscount Micklethwaite, (c. 1680–1734) English politician, peer and diplomat

See also
John Micklethwait
Micklethwaite (disambiguation)